Thomas Faulkner may refer to:

Thomas Faulkner (topographer) (1777–1855), English bookseller and topographer
Tom Faulkner (c. 1719–1785), English cricketer, wrestler and boxer
Thomas Faulkner (physicist), professor at the University of Illinois specialising in string theory

See also
Thomas Falconer (disambiguation)